Veikoso is a surname. Notable people with the surname include:

George Veikoso (born 1970), Fijiian-Hawaiian musician, vocalist, songwriter, producer, and actor
Jimmy Veikoso, Tongan rugby league footballer
Viliame Veikoso (born 1982), Fijian rugby union footballer